An easy keeper, easy doer or (British English) good doer is a livestock animal that can live on relatively little food.  The opposite of an easy keeper is a hard keeper (poor doer), an animal that is prone to be too thin and has difficulty maintaining adequate weight.  

Easy keepers tend to be found most often in breeds originally developed to survive under harsh conditions.  Most pony breeds are easy keepers, and smaller, hardy horse breeds such as the Arabian or Mustang have many representatives with this trait.  Many draft horse breeds, such as the Percheron are also easy keepers, as are most mules and donkeys.  If overfed with a too rich modern diet, the easy keeper is prone to obesity and other health problems, including laminitis and metabolic disorders.  

Easy keepers may be confused with a mare that is pregnant.  However, an easy keeper tends to gain weight all over its body, not just in the belly.  Easy keepers are not always easy to distinguish from a normal horse that is too fat from simple overfeeding.  However, an easy keeper will gain weight more quickly and lose weight more slowly than an ordinary horse, and when fed a standard diet geared toward an average horse, will gain, rather than maintain, weight.  

While it is not a problem to keep enough weight on an easy keeper, modern animal husbandry practices are often a challenge to such animals, as a modern diet can lead to a number of health problems, including obesity and, in some cases, laminitis. Some easy keepers may be prone to insulin resistance, equine metabolic syndrome (EMS), and possibly are more likely to develop Cushing's disease later in life.  Easy keepers with a susceptibility to various metabolic problems are also more prone to develop a "cresty" neck, and to not lose weight in that area, even when placed on a diet. Regularly monitoring the horse's body condition score on a regular basis assists in helping the horse maintain proper weight.

Feeding
While easy keepers often thrive in the wild and can survive where other horses might starve, domesticated horses with this trait require strict monitoring of their diet. In particular, easy keepers require very limited amounts of fructan and other non-structural carbohydrates (NSC). NSCs are found in higher concentrations in fresh spring grass, cool-season grasses, whole grains, late fall grass that has been exposed to a light but not killing frost, and drought-stressed pastures.  NSCs are lower in healthy summer pastures, warm-season grasses, and in pelleted feeds.

Proper nutrition for an easy keeper involves restricting the diet to mostly a low-NSC hay or very time-limited amounts of grazing on healthy pastures.   

Any grain or other concentrated feed is only required in very small quantities, if at all, even for a horse that is getting regular work.  However, an easy keeper may occasionally require vitamin or mineral supplements.  When this is the case, a separate commercial supplement added to a very small quantity of feed that is not premixed with supplements is preferred to a premixed "complete" feed that has supplements added. A complete feed has to be fed at a certain quantity for the animal to obtain proper amounts of the added supplements, which is often more food than an easy keeper requires. 

If a complete feed is needed because the horse is used for intense physical activity with high energy requirements, or as a supplement due to a hay shortage or when there are very high prices for fodder that make a complete feed a cost-effective option, there are specialized complete feeds designed for ponies and easy keepers.  These mixes are low in calories and NSC, but with necessary nutrition.  In the United Kingdom, these feeds are sometimes called "pony nuts". In the United States, there is no special term, though such feeds are often labeled as "Lite" feeds, or marketed as a pony mix.

Management of an easy keeper requires not only monitoring of diet but also regular exercise, ideally aerobic exercise obtained by riding or driving the animal on a regular basis.

See also
Equine nutrition
Henneke horse body condition scoring system

References
Safer Grass website
Adams, Martin. "Feeding the Easy Keeper" EquuSSource, accessed September 29, 2007
Ralston, Sarah. "Maintenance of the "Easy Keeper" Horse", Publication Number: FS799, Rutgers NJAES Cooperative Extension, 1 December 2001
Gray, Lynda F. "How to Keep Weight off Your Horse: Managing the Easy Keeper", SmartPakEquine, accessed September 29, 2007

External links
 Equine Facts, Henneke Body Condition Scoring table including photos
 How to Condition Score Horses

Horse management